Olivia Carlena Cole (November 26, 1942 – January 19, 2018) was an American actress, best known for her Emmy Award-winning role in the 1977 miniseries Roots.

Early life and education
Cole was born in Memphis, Tennessee, the daughter of Arvelia Cole (née Cage), a tennis player, instructor, entrepreneur and William Calvin Cole, a worker for Grumman. After graduating from Manhattan's Hunter College High School in 1960, she studied drama at Bard College in New York and earned a scholarship to attend the Royal Academy of Dramatic Art in London, where she graduated with honors in 1964. After returning to the United States, she earned a master's degree in theater arts with minor in Scandinavian studies in 1967 from the University of Minnesota.

Career 
Cole made her screen debut in the daytime soap opera Guiding Light in 1969 and later appeared in over 30 shows and films.

Cole won an Emmy Award for her performance as Matilda, Chicken George's wife, in the 1977 miniseries Roots. Cole became the first African American actress to win an Emmy award in the category of Outstanding Supporting Actress in a Miniseries or Movie for her performance in Roots.

She also was known for her role as Maggie Rogers in the 1979 miniseries Backstairs at the White House, for which she was nominated for a Primetime Emmy Award for Outstanding Lead Actress in a Miniseries or a Movie.

Cole starred in the CBS sitcoms Szysznyk from 1977 to 1978 and Report to Murphy in 1982. She also was cast in the ABC drama miniseriesThe Women Of Brewster Place with Oprah Winfrey in 1990 and previously appeared in another miniseries North and South, Book I (1985). She also guest-starred on Police Woman, Family, L.A. Law, "Christy" and Murder, She Wrote.

Cole's Broadway credits include The School for Scandal, You Can't Take It with You, The Merchant of Venice, and The National Health.

She was an honorary member of the Alpha Kappa Alpha sorority. In film, she appeared in Heroes (1977), Coming Home (1978), Some Kind of Hero (1982), Go Tell It on the Mountain (1984), Big Shots (1987), First Sunday (2008) as well as in the television movies Something About Amelia (1984) and The Women of Brewster Place (1989).

Personal life and death
In June 1971, she married actor Richard Venture, one of the few to enter an interracial marriage in Hollywood at that time. They later divorced in 1984. She retired in 1995, but later returned to acting.

Cole died 31 days after ex-husband, actor Richard Venture; at her home in San Miguel de Allende, Mexico on January 19, 2018, age 75 following a heart attack.

Filmography

Awards and nominations 
 1977 Primetime Emmy award, Outstanding Single Performance by a Supporting Actress in a Comedy or Drama Series for Roots - won
 1979 Primetime Emmy award, Outstanding Lead Actress in a Limited Series or Special for Backstairs at the White House - nominated
 2007 TV Land award, Anniversary award (shared with LeVar Burton, Louis Gossett, Jr., Leslie Uggams, John Amost, Ben Vereen, Todd Bridges, Cicely Tyson, Lawrence-Hilton Jacobs, Georg Stanford Brown) for Roots

References

External links

1942 births
2018 deaths
African-American actresses
American stage actresses
American film actresses
American television actresses
Actresses from Memphis, Tennessee
Bard College alumni
20th-century American actresses
21st-century American actresses
Alumni of RADA
Hunter College High School alumni
20th-century African-American women
20th-century African-American people
21st-century African-American women
21st-century African-American people